John Te One Hippolite (25 August 1929–27 February 1993) was a New Zealand  farm labourer, political activist, nurse. Of Māori descent, he identified with the Ngati Koata, Ngati Kuia and Ngati Toa iwi. He was born in D'Urville Island, Marlborough, New Zealand on 25 August 1929.

Hippolite attended Nelson College from 1944 to 1945.

References

1929 births
1993 deaths
New Zealand nurses
New Zealand activists
People from D'Urville Island, New Zealand
Ngāti Koata people
Ngāti Kuia people
Ngāti Toa people
New Zealand Māori activists
New Zealand Māori nurses
People educated at Nelson College
20th-century New Zealand politicians